Assin Fosu is a town and is the capital of Assin Central Municipal District, in the Central Region of Ghana. Assin Fosu is the 65th most populous settlement in Ghana, with a population of 20,541. The town is known for the Obiri Yeboah Secondary School School.  The school is a second cycle institution.

References

Populated places in the Central Region (Ghana)